Mohamed El-Zayat (born 1 April 2001) is an Egyptian para taekwondo practitioner. He won the silver medal in the men's 61 kg event at the 2020 Summer Paralympics in Tokyo, Japan. He received a kick to the head in his semi-final match against Daniil Sidorov. El-Zayat advanced to the final but he was unable to compete due to his injuries and, as a result, Nathan Torquato was awarded the gold medal.

References

Living people
2001 births
Place of birth missing (living people)
Egyptian male taekwondo practitioners
Paralympic taekwondo practitioners of Egypt
Taekwondo practitioners at the 2020 Summer Paralympics
Medalists at the 2020 Summer Paralympics
Paralympic silver medalists for Egypt
Paralympic medalists in taekwondo
21st-century Egyptian people